Robert Walker Macbeth  (30 September 1848 – 1 November 1910) was a Scottish painter, etcher and watercolourist, specialising in pastoral landscape and the rustic genre. His father was the portrait painter Norman Macbeth and his niece Ann Macbeth. Two of his five brothers, James Macbeth (1847–1891) and Henry Macbeth, later Macbeth-Raeburn  (1860–1947), were also artists.

Life

Born in Glasgow, Macbeth studied art in London, producing realistic everyday scenes and working as an illustrator for the weekly newspaper The Graphic. He painted in the Lincolnshire and Somerset countryside, his landscape work influenced by that of George Heming Mason and Frederick Walker. His The Cast Shoe was bought by the Chantrey Bequest in 1890 and is now at Tate Britain.

From 1871 Macbeth exhibited at the Royal Academy, the Royal Society of Portrait Painters, the Grosvenor Gallery, the New Gallery, and the Fine Art Society, all in Westminster. There were also exhibitions in the regions at the Royal Birmingham Society of Artists in Birmingham, the Royal Scottish Academy in Edinburgh, the Royal Glasgow Institute of the Fine Arts, the Walker Art Gallery in Liverpool and Manchester Art Gallery.

In the same year (1871) Macbeth was made an associate of the Royal Watercolour Society (RWS) becoming a full member in 1901. He became a member of the Royal Society of Painter-Etchers and Engravers (RE) in 1880, and an honorary member in 1909. In 1882 he was elected a member of the Royal Institute of Painters in Water Colours (RI) and in 1883 was elected to be a member of the Royal Institute of Oil Painters (ROI). In 1883 he was elected an associate of the Royal Academy (RA), becoming a full member in 1903.

On 9 August 1887, he married Lydia Esther, daughter of General Bates of the Bombay native cavalry. Their daughter, Phillis Macbeth, was better known as the actress Lydia Bilbrook. He died at Holder's Green, near Lindsell, Essex.

1895 Macbeth painted a mural, Opening of the Royal Exchange by Her Majesty Queen Victoria, 28th October 1844, which can be seen in the Royal Exchange, London.

Gallery

[[File:Robert Walker Macbeth - Our First Tiff - Google Art Project.jpg|thumb|Our First Tiff, by Macbeth, oil on canvas, 1878]]

References

Bibliography
J. L. Caw, Scottish Painting 1620–1908 (Edinburgh; London: T.C. & E.C. Jack, 1908).
Christopher Wood, The Dictionary of Victorian Painters, Woodbridge, 1971
Johnson, J., and Anna Gruetzner Robins, The Dictionary of British Artists 1880–1940 (Woodbridge, 1980)
 Giles Walkley, Artists' houses in London 1764–1914 (Aldershot, 1994).
Donato Esposito, 'Robert Walker Macbeth (1848–1910)’, in Frederick Walker and the Idyllists (London: Lund Humphries, 2017), pp. 137–57.

External links

 
Portraits of RW Macbeth at the National Portrait Gallery
Biography
 Profile on Royal Academy of Arts Collections

1848 births
1910 deaths
19th-century Scottish painters
Scottish male painters
20th-century Scottish painters
Artists from Glasgow
Scottish watercolourists
Scottish landscape painters
Artists' Rifles soldiers
Royal Academicians
19th-century Scottish male artists
20th-century Scottish male artists